Ibbinet Companion # 1.5 is a 1998 solo album by Jimmy Ibbotson of the Nitty Gritty Dirt Band.

Track listing
"The Girl From The North End Of The Island"
"The Luncheonette"
"Miss Maudey"
"It's Morning"
"The Parade Of The Casino Elephants"
"Everyone's Gonna Love Goin' Downhill From Here"
"Tiny Lou Lou"
"Baby Tonite"
"Geraldo's Tequila"
"Try Not To Cry"
"Drive It Like It Is"
"Wheels"
"Sugar Babe"
"NGDB Calypso # 1"
"Mr. Bojangles"
"Ripplin' Waters"

Personnel
Jimmy Ibbotson - guitar, mandolin, vocals
with:
John McEuen
Tracy McLain

References
All content unless otherwise noted.

1998 albums
Jimmy Ibbotson albums